Profeta is an Italian surname. Notable people with the surname include:

Antonino Profeta (born 1988), Italian footballer
Carlo Profeta, acting capo in Domenico Cutaia's crew.
Luca Profeta (born 1990), Italian footballer
Ottavio Profeta (1890–1963), Italian poet

Italian-language surnames